Eversmannia exornata is a species of moth, belonging to the family Uraniidae.

The species was described in 1837 by Eduard Friedrich Eversmann as Idaea exornata.

It is native to Eastern Europe.

References

Uraniidae